Qarah Chay (also Romanized as Qarah Chāy and Qareh Chāy) is a village in Atrak Rural District, Maneh District, Maneh and Samalqan County, North Khorasan Province, Iran. At the 2006 census, its population was 179, in 43 families.

References 

Populated places in Maneh and Samalqan County